Nina Sovinek (born 26 May 1985) is a Slovenian swimmer, who specialized in sprint freestyle events. She represented her nation Slovenia at the 2008 Summer Olympics, and also served as a member of the Slovenian Olympic Swimming Club under head coach Aleš Poljak.

Sovinek competed for the Slovenian swimming team in a sprint freestyle double at the 2008 Summer Olympics in Beijing. Leading up to the Games, she snatched the 50 m freestyle title with a sterling 26.27 to sneak under the FINA B-cut (26.32) by 0.05 seconds at the Slovenia Open in Ljubljana, and then picked up the 100 m freestyle to her program by finishing with a thirteenth-place time in 56.11 at the European Championships in Eindhoven, Netherlands. In the 100 m freestyle, Sovinek fell short to last place in heat three and forty-third overall with a steady 57.30. Two days later, in the 50 m freestyle, Sovinek touched the wall ahead of a stiff challenge from Elaine Chan for the fourth spot in heat seven and forty-fourth overall by 0.05 of a second, finishing with a time of 26.54.

References

External links
NBC Olympics Profile

1985 births
Living people
Slovenian female swimmers
Olympic swimmers of Slovenia
Swimmers at the 2008 Summer Olympics
Slovenian female freestyle swimmers
People from Velenje